Regillio is a given name. Notable people with the name include:

Regillio Nooitmeer (born 1983), Dutch-Haitian footballer
Regillio Simons (born 1973), Dutch footballer
Regillio Tuur (born 1986), Belgian footballer
Regillio Vrede (born 1973), Dutch footballer

See also
Regilio